KML or kml may refer to:
Kamileroi Airport (IATA airport code), Queensland, Australia
Kemsley railway station (National Rail station code), Kent, England
Keyhole Markup Language, an XML geospatial data file format
Korean Mountaineering League, an organization that focuses on the conservation of Korea's mountain environments
Lower Tanudan Kalinga (ISO 639-3 language code), a language used in Tanudan, Kalinga, Philippines
Korvpalli Meistriliiga, the Estonian Basketball League
KiSS Markup Language, an html-like file format used by certain KiSS and Linksys products
Labuan Matriculation College